Stability of matter refers to the problem of showing rigorously that a large number of charged quantum particles can coexist and form macroscopic objects, like ordinary matter. The first proof was provided by Freeman Dyson and Andrew Lenard in 1967–1968, but a shorter and more conceptual proof was found later by Elliott Lieb and Walter Thirring in 1975.

Background and history 

In statistical mechanics, the existence of macroscopic objects is usually explained in terms of the behavior of the energy or the free energy with respect to the total number  of particles.
 
Upper bounds are usually easy to show in applications, and this is why people have worked more on proving lower bounds.

Neglecting other forces, it is reasonable to assume that ordinary matter is composed of negative and positive non-relativistic charges (electrons and nuclei), interacting solely via the Coulomb force. A finite number of such particles always collapses in classical mechanics, due to the infinite depth of the electron-nucleus attraction, but it can exist in quantum mechanics thanks to Heisenberg's uncertainty principle. Proving that such a system is thermodynamically stable is called the stability of matter problem and it is very difficult due to the long range of the Coulomb potential. Stability should be a consequence of screening effects, but those are hard to quantify.

Let us denote by 

the quantum Hamiltonian of  electrons and  nuclei of charges  and masses  in atomic units. Here  denotes the Laplacian, which is the quantum kinetic energy operator. At zero temperature, the question is whether the ground state energy (the minimum of the spectrum of ) is bounded from below by a constant times the total number of particles:

The constant  can depend on the largest number of spin states for each particle as well as the largest value of the charges . It should ideally not depend on the masses  so as to be able to consider the infinite mass limit, that is, classical nuclei.

Dyson showed in 1967 that if all the particles are bosons, then the inequality cannot be true and the system is thermodynamically unstable.
It is therefore important that either the positive or negative charges are fermions. In other words, stability of matter is a consequence of the Pauli exclusion principle. In real life electrons are indeed fermions, but finding the right way to use Pauli's principle and prove stability turned out to be remarkably difficult. Michael Fischer and David Ruelle formalized the conjecture in 1966 and offered a bottle of Champagne to anybody who could prove it. Dyson and Lenard found the proof of  a year later and therefore got the bottle.

As was mentioned before, stability is a necessary condition for the existence of macroscopic objets, but it does not immediately imply the existence of thermodynamic functions. One should really show that the energy really behaves linearly in the number of particles. Based on the Dyson-Lenard result, this was solved in an ingenious way by Elliott Lieb and Joel Lebowitz in 1972.

The Dyson-Lenard proof is ″extraordinarily complicated and difficult″ and relies on deep and tedious analytical bounds. In 1975, Elliott Lieb and Walter Thirring found a simpler and more conceptual proof, based on a spectral inequality, now called the Lieb-Thirring inequality. 
They got a constant  which was by several orders of magnitude smaller than the Dyson-Lenard constant and had a realistic value.
They arrived at the final inequality

Since , this yields the desired linear lower bound. 
The idea of Lieb-Thirring was to bound the quantum energy from below in terms of the Thomas-Fermi energy. The latter is always stable due to a theorem of Edward Teller which states that atoms can never bind in Thomas-Fermi theory. 
The new Lieb-Thirring inequality was used to bound the quantum kinetic energy of the electrons in terms of the Thomas-Fermi kinetic energy . Teller's No-Binding Theorem was in fact also used to bound from below the total Coulomb interaction in terms of the simpler Hartree energy appearing in Thomas-Fermi theory. Speaking about the Lieb-Thirring proof, Freeman Dyson wrote later

 ″Lenard and I found a proof of the stability of matter in 1967. Our proof was so complicated and so unilluminating that it stimulated Lieb and Thirring to find the first decent proof. (...) Why was our proof so bad and why was theirs so good? The reason is simple. Lenard and I began with mathematical tricks and hacked our way through a forest of inequalities without any physical understanding. Lieb and Thirring began with physical understanding and went on to find the appropriate mathematical language to make their understanding rigorous. Our proof was a dead end. Theirs was a gateway to the new world of ideas.″

The Lieb-Thirring approach has generated many subsequent works and extensions. 
(Pseudo-)Relativistic systems

, 
magnetic fields

 
quantized fields
 

and two-dimensional fractional statistics (anyons)

have for instance been studied since the Lieb-Thirring paper. 
The form of the bound has also been improved over the years. For example, one can obtain a constant independent of the number  of nuclei.

Bibliography 
 The Stability of Matter: From Atoms to Stars. Selecta of Elliott H. Lieb. Edited by W. Thirring, and with a preface by F. Dyson. Fourth edition. Springer, Berlin, 2005.
 Elliott H. Lieb and Robert Seiringer, The Stability of Matter in Quantum Mechanics. Cambridge Univ. Press, 2010.
 Elliott H. Lieb, The stability of matter: from atoms to stars. Bull. Amer. Math. Soc. (N.S.) 22 (1990), no. 1, 1-49.

References 

Mathematical physics
Statistical mechanics theorems